Olema (Miwok: Olemaloke) is an unincorporated community in Marin County, California.

Olema is along State Route 1 at its intersection with Sir Francis Drake Boulevard, on the eastern edge of the Point Reyes Peninsula in the western part of Marin County. The name Olema comes from the Coast Miwok placename meaning "coyote valley".

Olema was once thought to be the epicenter of the 1906 San Francisco earthquake due to the huge fault rifts still visible via a nearby hiking path.  There are historical references to this in and around the town, including at shops and restaurants.  However, more recent evidence suggests that a location near Daly City is more likely the epicenter.

Olema was also the title subject of the late-1960s country-rock song, "Hippie from Olema", The Youngbloods' rejoinder to Merle Haggard's "Okie from Muskogee".

The Olema post office opened in 1859, closed in 1860, and re-opened in 1864.

Attractions

Olema has a few shops, two restaurants (Sir and Star and Due West), a lodge, and several bed and breakfasts. Nearby is a large campground and also a large retreat for the Vedanta Society (a branch of Hinduism). Also, the Bear Valley Visitor Center, a quarter-mile from town on Bear Valley Road, provides a standard starting point for a visit to the Point Reyes National Seashore. Inside the center are exhibits and books for sale. Outside are picnic tables, a Morgan horse ranch, and Kule Loklo, a reconstructed Miwok village.

Politics
In the state legislature, Olema is in the 3rd Senate District and in the 6th Assembly District.

References

Unincorporated communities in California
Unincorporated communities in Marin County, California
West Marin